The 2020 FIFA Club World Cup (officially known as the FIFA Club World Cup Qatar 2020 presented by Alibaba Cloud for sponsorship reasons) was the 17th edition of the FIFA Club World Cup, a FIFA-organised international club football tournament between the winners of the six continental confederations, as well as the host nation's league champions. The tournament was hosted by Qatar.

The event was postponed to 2021 due to the COVID-19 pandemic, as the AFC, CONMEBOL, and CONCACAF champions would not have been decided in time for the tournament. Originally to be held in December 2020, on 17 November of the same year FIFA announced that the competition would be played between 1 and 11 February 2021.

Originally seven teams were to compete in the tournament. However, OFC's representatives Auckland City withdrew due to the COVID-19 pandemic and related quarantine measures required by the New Zealand authorities. As a result, only six teams competed, and the first round match, originally scheduled on 1 February 2021, was awarded as a 3–0 win to their first round opponents, host Qatar's representatives Al-Duhail, who advanced automatically to the second round on 4 February 2021.

Defending champions Liverpool did not qualify as they were eliminated in the round of 16 of the 2019–20 UEFA Champions League. The eventual winners of that competition, Bayern Munich, went on to win the Club World Cup for a second time, beating Al Ahly 2–0 in the semi-finals, before a 1–0 win over UANL in the final final. In winning the title, Bayern Munich became only the second club in European football history (after Barcelona in 2009) to win all six competitions they entered (commonly known as a sextuple) in a single calendar year.

Host appointment
With proposals for an expanded Club World Cup, FIFA delayed the announcement of a host. On 28 May 2019, FIFA announced that the 2019 and 2020 tournament host would be appointed at the FIFA Council meeting in Paris, France, on 3 June 2019.

Qatar was appointed as the host for the 2019 and 2020 tournaments on 3 June 2019, serving as test events ahead of their hosting of the 2022 FIFA World Cup. The tournament retained its original format ahead of the scheduled revamp.

Qualified teams

Notes

Venues 

The matches were played in the city of Al Rayyan, at the Ahmad bin Ali Stadium and Education City Stadium; both 40,000-seat venues which would later host matches at the 2022 FIFA World Cup. Due to the COVID-19 pandemic in Qatar, attendance was limited to only 30% of the stadiums' seating capacity. A third stadium in Al Rayyan, Khalifa International Stadium, would originally have hosted two matches, but following the withdrawal of Auckland City and the subsequent revision of the match schedule, it was not used for the tournament.

Match officials
Seven referees, twelve assistant referees, and seven video assistant referees were appointed for the tournament. Brazilian referee Edina Alves Batista became the first woman to officiate at a senior FIFA men's tournament.

Squads

Each team had to name a 23-man squad (three of whom must be goalkeepers). Injury replacements were allowed until 24 hours before the team's first match.

Matches
The match schedule was announced on 23 December 2020, with a revised schedule with change of venues announced on 18 January 2021. The draw of the tournament was held on 19 January 2021, 16:00 CET (UTC+1), at the FIFA headquarters in Zürich, Switzerland, to decide the matchups of the second round (between the first round winner and teams from AFC, CAF and CONCACAF), and the opponents of the two second round winners in the semi-finals (against teams from CONMEBOL and UEFA). At the time of the draw, the identity of the CONMEBOL team was not known.

If a match was tied after normal playing time:
For elimination matches, extra time was played. If still tied after extra time, a penalty shoot-out was held to determine the winner.
For the matches for fifth place and third place, no extra time was played, and a penalty shoot-out was held to determine the winner.

All times are listed in AST (UTC+3).

First round

Second round

Match for fifth place

Semi-finals

Match for third place

Final

Goalscorers

Final ranking
Per statistical convention in football, matches decided in extra time were counted as wins and losses, while matches decided by penalty shoot-out were counted as draws.

Awards

The following awards were given at the conclusion of the tournament. Robert Lewandowski of Bayern Munich won the Golden Ball award, sponsored by Adidas, which is jointly awarded with the Alibaba Cloud Award to recognise the player of the tournament.

FIFA also named a man of the match for the best player in each game at the tournament.

Notes

References

External links

 
2020
2020 in association football
2021 in association football
2020 Fifa Club World Cup
2020–21 in Qatari football
February 2021 sports events in Asia
Association football events postponed due to the COVID-19 pandemic
Sport in Al Rayyan